"This Kind of Town" is a song written by Andrew Dorff and Chris Tompkins and recorded by American country music artist Justin Moore.  It was released on October 20, 2014 as the third single from Moore's 2013 album Off the Beaten Path.

Critical reception
Website Taste of Country gave the song a positive review, saying that "[the] ballad reminisces about the hallmarks of 'Small Town USA'. Blue collars, Friday night football, Sunday morning church … If Rockwell was a country singer, he’d write this kind of song."

Chart performance
The song peaked at number 44 on the US Billboard Country Airplay chart and at number 50 on Hot Country Songs, becoming Moore's lowest peaking single since "Back That Thing Up", his debut single, peaked at number 38 in 2008.

References

2013 songs
2014 singles
Justin Moore songs
Big Machine Records singles
Songs written by Chris Tompkins
Songs written by Andrew Dorff
Song recordings produced by Jeremy Stover